War of Kings may refer to:

War of Kings, comic book crossover storyline written by Dan Abnett and Andy Lanning, published by Marvel Comics, and set in Marvel's main shared universe
War of Kings (album), 2015 album by Europe

See also
War of Kings, or Battle of Siddim, the conflict described in Book of Genesis